The School of Ferrara was a group of painters which flourished in the Duchy of Ferrara during the Renaissance. Ferrara was ruled by the Este family, well known for its patronage of the arts. Patronage was extended with the ascent of Ercole d'Este I in 1470, and the family continued in power till Alfonso II, Ercole's great-grandson, died without an heir in 1597. The duchy was then occupied in succession by Papal and Austrian forces. The school evolved styles of painting that appeared to blend influences from Mantua, Venice, Lombardy, Bologna, and Florence.

The ties to Bolognese School were particularly strong. Much of the local collections, like those of the Gonzaga family in Mantua, were dispersed with the end of the Este line in 1598.  Especially in the late 15th century Ferrara was also a main centre of engraving in Italy.  The most famous prints it produced are the two sets traditionally, if inaccurately, known as the Mantegna Tarocchi, each by an unidentified master.  A list of painters of the School of Ferrara, with the page for the title entry in Camillo Laderchi's 1856 artist biography, includes:

14th century and before
Gelasio di Nicoló, p20
Cristoforo da Bologna, p28
Antonio Alberti, p29

15th century
Galasso Galassi
Cosimo Tura, p30
Francesco Cossa, p32
Bono da Ferrara, p33
Stefano da Ferrara, p37
Baldassare Estense, p38
Antonio Aleotti, p39
Ercole Grandi, p51
Ludovico Mazzolino, p54
Michele Cortellini, p39
Ercole de' Roberti
Lorenzo Costa, p57
Francesco and Bernardino Zaganelli da Cotignola, p58
Benedetto Coda, p59
Boccaccio Boccaccino
Domenico Panetti, p61
Giovanni Battista Benvenuti (also called L'Ortolano Ferrarese) (1490–1525)
Taddeo Crivelli

16th century
Nicolo Pisano
Dosso Dossi, p62
Giovanni Battista Dossi
Girolamo da Carpi, p105
Niccolò Roselli, p109
Benvenuto Tisi (il Garofalo), p73
Ludovico Mazzolino
Sigismondo Scarsella, p124
Scarsellino (Ippolito Scarsella), p125
Costanzo Cattanio
Giovanni Francesco Surchi
Camillo Ricci, p135
Domenico Mona, p121
Sebastiano Filippi (Bastianino)
Gaspare Venturini, p137
Giovanni Andrea Ghirardoni, p138
Giovanni Paolo Grazzini, p138
Jacopo Bambini, p139
Giulio Cromer, p140

17th–18th centuries
Carlo Bononi (also active in Bologna and Mantua), p141
Alfonso Rivarola, p153
Giovanni Battista della Torre, p154
Camillo Berlinghieri, p155
Ippolito Caselli, p155
Francesco Naselli, p156
Ercole Sarti, p157
Giovanni Francesco Barbieri (Guercino) born in Cento, p159
Paolo Antonio Barbieri, p168
Benedetto Genari the elder, p158
Cesare Genari, p170
Giuseppe Caletti, p170
Ludovico Lana, p172
Francesco Costanzo Cattaneo, p172
Giuseppe Bonati, p173
Giuseppe Avanzi, p175
Orazio and Cesare Mornasi, p175
Francesco and Antonio Ferrari, p176
Francesco Scala, p177
Maurelio Scanavini, p178
Giacomo Parolini, p179
Giuseppe Zola, p181
Giovanni Francesco Braccioli, p182
Antonio Contri, p183
Giuseppe Ghedini, p183
Giovanni Monti, p184
Alberto Muchiatti, p184
Giuseppe Santi, p184
Giovanni Masi, p185

See also 
Lucchese School
Florentine School
Sienese School

References

External links 

Dosso Dossi: Court Painter in Renaissance Ferrara, a full text exhibition catalog from The Metropolitan Museum of Art
 Census of Ferrarese Paintings and Drawings 
Italian Paintings: North Italian School, a collection catalog containing information on a variety of Ferrara artists.

Ferrara
Painters from Ferrara
People from the Province of Ferrara